The Northeastern Buckeye Conference  (NBC), was an OHSAA high school athletic conference that comprised eight high schools in Northeast Ohio.

Final members

Former members

League history
The NBC was established in September 1988 and began league play in the fall of 1989.  The six founding members were Carrollton, Dover, Marlington, Minerva, Northwest, and West Branch.  Due to contractual obligations to the Federal League, Canton South and Louisville could not compete until the following year (1990–91).  
Dover left for the East Central Ohio League after the 1992-93 school year and was replaced by Springfield in 1993-94.  
Springfield left after 2004-05 for the newly created Portage Trail Conference and was replaced by Alliance in 2005-06.  
In anticipation of having to discontinue sports due to a series of levy failures, Northwest left the conference after the 2010-11 school year and was replaced by Salem beginning with the 2011-12 school year.
In December 2015, discussions were held by all conference members (except Louisville) to potentially leave the NBC and create a new league without the Leopards.  Three other schools were also included in the discussions: South Range, Crestview, and Beaver Local. 
On February 4, 2016, the NBC voted to disband, and all conference members besides Louisville agreed to form a new league.
On June 1, 2016, WKBN-TV 27 Youngstown reported that Alliance, Canton South, Carrollton, Marlington, Minerva, Salem and West Branch will form the Eastern Buckeye Conference for the 2018-2019 school year, along with South Range, who will leave the Inter Tri-County League. Louisville will become a league independent. South Range left the Eastern Buckeye Conference before a game was played, choosing to accept an invitation to the newly formed Northeast 8 Athletic Conference instead. The league disbanded after the Spring 2018 sports season.

Conference championships

Boys sports

Girls sports

See also
 Ohio High School Athletic Conferences

References

External links
NBC League Champions and Current Schedules
NBC Membership History
Salem joins NBC athletic league.  The Alliance Review, 12 Jan. 2010
Louisville Leopards Sports History.

Ohio high school sports conferences